Madhura Swapna is a 2016 Kannada language film. It is directed by Ravirathnam Karamala starring Arjun Kapikad and Keerthana Podwal in the lead roles, and  Vinaya Prasad,  Avinash, Ashok, Mukhyamantri Chandru, and Ramakrishna in supporting roles.

The film released on 19 February 2016. It was filmed in the following locations: Bengaluru, Kolara, Kolar Gold Fields, Sakleshpur, Mangalooru and Ramoji film city,

Soundtrack

Reception

References

2016 films
Indian romance films
2010s Kannada-language films
2016 romance films